Sakichi (written: 佐吉) is a masculine Japanese given name. Notable people with the name include:

, Japanese actor, film director and screenwriter
, Japanese inventor and businessman

Japanese masculine given names